The 1983 Southeast Asian Games, officially known as the 12th Southeast Asian Games, or informally Singapore 1983, was a Southeast Asian multi-sport event held in Singapore from 28 May to 6 June 1983. Scheduled to be hosted by Brunei in accordance to the renewed alphabetical rotation of hosting duties, the 1983 SEA Games were offered to be hosted by Singapore as Brunei prepared for its forthcoming independence from the United Kingdom. The games also marked the return of Cambodia, as People's Republic of Kampuchea after an 8-year-long absence since the Khmer Rouge seized power in 1975.

The games was opened and closed by Devan Nair, the President of Singapore at the Singapore National Stadium. The final medal tally was led by Indonesia, followed by the Philippines, Thailand and host Singapore.

The games

Participating nations
Brunei was a British colony at that time until independence on January 1, 1984.

Sports

Medal table

Key

References

 
 History of the SEA Games

 
Southeast Asian Games
Southeast Asian Games
International sports competitions hosted by Singapore
Southeast Asian Games, 1983
Southeast Asian Games
Southeast Asian Games
Southeast Asian Games
Multi-sport events in Singapore